Si Vis Pacem, Para Bellum (English: "If You Want Peace, Prepare for War") is the eighth studio album by South African rock band Seether. It was released on 28 August 2020 through Fantasy Records and was produced by lead vocalist Shaun Morgan. The album's first single, "Dangerous", was released ahead of the album in June 2020, as well as "Bruised and Bloodied" in July and "Beg" in August. A deluxe edition was released on July 1, 2022.

Background and promotion
In June 2019, John Humphrey revealed that recording had commenced for their upcoming eighth studio album, with frontman Shaun Morgan creating demos and sharing them with band members. On 24 June 2020, the band announced the album itself set for release on 28 August 2020 through Fantasy Records. They also released the first single of the album, "Dangerous". Translating to "If You Want Peace, Prepare for War", the album features 13 new tracks, and was produced by Morgan himself in Nashville, Tennessee from December 2019 to January 2020. On 17 July, the band released the second single, "Bruised and Bloodied". On 14 August, two weeks before the album release, the band released a third song "Beg".

Composition and themes
Morgan explained that the album's sound was influenced by late 1990s alternative rock, specifically A Perfect Circle and Deftones, which he had been listening to heavily in recent years. The album combines the guitar riffs commonly found in 1990s rock with the atmospheric sounds found in A Perfect Circle's music. Morgan also aimed to move away from the standard "verse-pre-chorus-chorus" song structure commonly found in mainstream music.

Track listing

Notes
 Tracks 14 to 17 are originally from Wasteland – The Purgatory EP.

Personnel
Credits adapted from AllMusic and the album's liner notes.

Seether
 Shaun Morgan – lead vocals, guitar, production
 Dale Stewart – bass, backing vocals
 Corey Lowery – guitar, backing vocals, engineering
 John Humphrey – drums

Additional personnel
 Matt Hyde – engineering, mixing
 Ted Jensen – mastering
 Matt Marshall – A&R
 Shawn Coss – artwork
 Florian Mihr – package design

Charts

References

2020 albums
Fantasy Records albums
Seether albums